Luis Alberto "Manzanita" Hernández Díaz (born 15 February 1981) is a former professional Peruvian footballer who plays as a midfielder. He currently working as a coach for the youth team of Sport Boy. He is the younger brother of Juan Francisco Hernández.

Club career
Luis Alberto Hernández made his league debut in the Torneo Descentralizado in the 1998 season with Alianza Lima, making 8 appearances in that season. He played for Alianza until the end of the 2002 season.

Then for the 2003 season Luis Alberto joined Coronel Bolognesi.

International career

References

1981 births
Living people
People from Lima
Peruvian footballers
Peru international footballers
Club Alianza Lima footballers
Coronel Bolognesi footballers
Club Universitario de Deportes footballers
Club Deportivo Universidad César Vallejo footballers
Colegio Nacional Iquitos footballers
Cobresol FBC footballers
Sport Huancayo footballers
FBC Melgar footballers
Peruvian Primera División players
Association football midfielders